The 2006–07 season was the 92nd season of the Isthmian League, which is an English football competition featuring semi-professional and amateur clubs from London, East and South East England. Also, it was the first season for newly created divisions One North and One South.

Premier Division

The Premier Division consisted of 22 clubs, including 16 clubs from the previous season, and six new clubs.

 Three clubs promoted from Division One:
 Horsham
 Ramsgate
 Tonbridge Angels

 Plus
 Ashford Town (Middlesex), promoted as runners-up of Southern Football League Western Division
 Boreham Wood, promoted as champions of Southern Football League Eastern Division
 Carshalton Athletic, relegated from the Conference South

Hampton & Richmond Borough won the division and were promoted to the Conference South along with play-off winners Bromley. Worthing, Walton & Hersham and Slough Town were relegated, while Harrow Borough, initially also relegated as the worst 19th-placed club among seventh level leagues, were reprieved as an effect of the Conference clubs Farnborough Town and Scarborough folded, Lancaster City demoted two levels down and Hayes merged with Yeading.

League table

Top scorers

Play-offs

Stadia and locations

Division One North

After the end of the previous season, Division One was restructured. Most of the previous season's Division One clubs were transferred to Division One South.

Division One North consisted of 22 clubs: eleven clubs transferred from Southern League Division One North, three clubs relegated from higher-level leagues and eight clubs promoted from lower-level leagues. Barking & East Ham United, another club from the Southern League, joined the division but resigned and folded before the start of the season.

 Eleven clubs transferred from Southern Football League Eastern Division:
 Arlesey Town
 Aveley
 Enfield
 Enfield Town
 Great Wakering Rovers
 Harlow Town
 Ilford
 Potters Bar Town
 Waltham Forest
 Wingate & Finchley
 Wivenhoe Town
 Two clubs relegated from the Premier Division:
 Maldon Town
 Redbridge
 Club demoted from the Conference National:
 Canvey Island
 Three clubs promoted from Division Two:
 Flackwell Heath
 Ware
 Witham Town
 Three clubs promoted from the Essex Senior League:
 AFC Hornchurch
 Tilbury
 Waltham Abbey
 Two clubs promoted from the Eastern Counties League:
 AFC Sudbury
 Bury Town

Maldon Town qualified for the play-offs but were ineligible for promotion due to ground grading issues, so Harlow Town received a bye to the play-off final which they won, and were promoted to the Premier Division along with AFC Hornchurch, who earned a second successive promotion. Flackwell Heath finished bottom of the table and were relegated. Ilford finished second bottom, but were reprieved to make up the number of clubs at eight tier after a few higher league clubs folded and merged and Northern Premier League was reformed.

League table

Top scorers

Play-offs

Stadia and locations

1.Harlow Town spent start of the season at their old stadium Sportscentre before moving to Barrows Farm at October.

Division One South

After the end of the previous season, Division One was restructured. Most of the previous season's Division One clubs were transferred to Division One South.

Division One South consisted of 22 clubs, 16 clubs transferred from previous season Division One and six new clubs.
 Three clubs transferred from Southern Football League Eastern Division:
 Chatham Town
 Dartford
 Sittingbourne
 Plus:
 Godalming Town, promoted as champions of the Combined Counties League
 Horsham YMCA, promoted as champions of the Sussex County League
 Maidstone United, promoted as champions of the Kent League

Maidstone United won their second title in a row and were promoted to the Premier Division along with play-off winners Hastings United. Both clubs finished in the relegation zone were reprieved to make up the number of clubs at eight tier after a few higher league clubs folded and merged and Northern Premier League was reformed.

League table

Top scorers

Play-offs

Stadia and locations

2.Dartford spent start of the season groundsharing with Ebbsfleet United before moving to Princes Park at November.

League Cup

The Isthmian League Cup 2006–07 was the 33rd season of the Isthmian League Cup, the league cup competition of the Isthmian League. Sixty-six clubs took part. The competition commenced on 22 August and finished on 4 April.

Calendar

Fixtures and results
Fixtures are listed in alphabetical order, not that which they were drawn in.

First round
Four clubs from division Ones participated in the First round, while all other clubs received a bye to the Second round.

Second round
The two clubs to have made it through the First round were entered into the Second Round draw with all other Isthmian League clubs, making sixty-four teams.

Third round

Fourth round

Quarterfinals

Semifinals

Final

See also
Isthmian League
2006–07 Northern Premier League
2006–07 Southern Football League

References

External links
Official website

Isthmian League seasons
7